Jinshu may refer to:
 The Book of Jin, one of the official Chinese historical works
 An alternate reading of the characters for Kannushi, a Shinto priest